Conchita Martínez and Patricia Tarabini won in the final 6–4, 6–2 against Martina Navratilova and Arantxa Sánchez-Vicario.

Seeds
Champion seeds are indicated in bold text while text in italics indicates the round in which those seeds were eliminated.

 Lisa Raymond /  Rennae Stubbs (semifinals)
 Virginia Ruano Pascual /  Paola Suárez (quarterfinals)
 Åsa Carlsson /  Kimberly Po (quarterfinals)
 Elena Likhovtseva /  Nicole Pratt (first round)

Draw

External links
 ITF tournament edition details

Amelia Island Championships
2001 WTA Tour